Ellery is a given name, and may refer to:

People

As a first name
 Ellery Eskelin, a jazz musician
 Ellery Sprayberry, an American actress
 Ellery Hollingsworth, an American professional snowboarder
 Ellery Schempp (born Ellory Schempp), a physicist
 Ellery Queen, pseudonym of authors Frederic Dannay and Manfred Lee
 Ellery Queen, fictional detective created by Dannay and Lee

As a second name
 William Ellery Channing, a Unitarian theologian
 William Ellery Channing (poet), a Transcendental poet
 George Ellery Hale, an American solar astronomer

See also
 Eleri (disambiguation), the Welsh form of Hilarus